Kaloshin is a Russian masculine surname, its feminine counterpart is Kaloshina. Notable people with the surname include:

Pavel Kaloshin (born 1998), Russian footballer
Vadim Kaloshin, Ukrainian mathematician

Russian-language surnames
Masculine surnames